William Hart (born at Wells, 1558; executed at York, 15 March 1583) was an English Roman Catholic priest. He is a Catholic martyr, beatified in 1886.

Life
Elected Trappes Scholar at Lincoln College, Oxford, 25 May 1571, he supplicated B.A., 18 June 1574. The same year he followed the rector, John Bridgewater, to Douai College. He accompanied the college to Reims, and returned there after a serious operation for kidney stones 22 November 1578 at Namur. He took the college oath at the English College, Rome, 23 April 1579, where he was ordained priest. On 26 March 1581, he left Rome, arriving at Reims 13 May, and resuming his journey on 22 May.

On reaching England he worked on a ministry in Yorkshire, frequently visiting imprisoned Catholics, providing comfort and what assistance he was able. He was present at the Mass at York Castle at which William Lacy was captured, and escaped by getting down the wall and wading through the moat up to his chin.

Betrayed by an apostate Catholic on Christmas Day, 1582, and thrown into an underground dungeon, he was put into double irons. After examination before the Dean of York and the Council of the North, he was arraigned at the Lent Assizes.

The account of his trial states that he was arraigned on two counts. He might have been on trial on three, namely:

under 13 Eliz. c. 2, for having brought papal writings, to wit his certificate of ordination, into the realm;
under 13 Eliz. c. 3, for having gone abroad without royal licence; and 
under 23 Eliz. c. 1, for having reconciled John Wright and one Couling to the Catholic Church.
On what counts he was found guilty does not clearly appear, but he was certainly guilty of the second.

References

Attribution
 The entry cites:
Bede Camm, Lives of the English Martyrs, II (London, 1904-5), 600-634
Joseph Gillow, Bibl. Dict. Eng. Cath.
Statutes at Large, II (London, 1786–1800)

1558 births
1583 deaths
English beatified people
16th-century venerated Christians
16th-century English Roman Catholic priests
People from Wells, Somerset
Alumni of Lincoln College, Oxford
Forty-one Martyrs of England and Wales